Irreligion, according to the South African National Census of 2001, accounts for the beliefs of 15.1% of people in South Africa, the majority of those being White.

A 2012 poll indicated that the number of South Africans who consider themselves religious decreased from 83% of the population in 2005 to 64% of the population in 2012.

See also
 Religion in South Africa
 Freedom of religion in South Africa
 Christianity in South Africa
 Islam in South Africa
 Demographics of South Africa

References

Further reading

Religion in South Africa
South Africa
South Africa